Taraganj is an upazila of Rangpur District in the Division of Rangpur, Bangladesh.

Geography
It has 21234 households and total area 128.64 km2.

Demographics
As of the 2011 Bangladesh census, Taraganj has a population of 140823. Males constitute 51.48% of the population, and females 48.52%. This Upazila's eighteen up population is 87803. Taraganj has an average literacy rate of 23.3% (7+ years), and the national average of 32.4% literate.

Points of interest

Taragonj Haat is a famous & big in the northern side of Bangladesh and also it is called a business linkage place of Rangpur district. Tara BIBI's mazar is situated in the middle of the Haat. and by the name of TARA BIBI Taragonj was name and it is populated to the people.

In Sadar of Taraganj there is 50 beds hospital, One Degree College, Degree Madrasa, One Boys high school, Girls high school.

Administration
Taraganj Upazila is divided into five union parishads: Alampur, Ekarchali, Hariarkuti, Kursha, and Sayar. The union parishads are subdivided into 40 mauzas and 41 villages.

See also
 Upazilas of Bangladesh
 Districts of Bangladesh
 Divisions of Bangladesh

References

Upazilas of Rangpur District